Ghanshyam Chhotalal Oza (25 October 1911 – 12 July 2002) was the Chief Minister of Gujarat, India from 17 March 1972 to 17 July 1973.
He had a B.A. and L.L.B. He was a member of the Legislative Assembly of Saurashtra State from 1948 to 1956. He later became a member of the Legislative Assembly of Bombay state in 1956. He was a member of the Lok Sabha from 1957 to 1967 and again from 1971 to 1972. Later, he was a member of the Rajya Sabha from 10 April 1978 to 9 April 1984. He was a member of the Gujarat Legislative Assembly from 1972-74.
He was a minister (1952–56) in U. N. Dhebar ministry when 'United State of Kathiawar' was formed. He became M.P. in 1957 when he won Lok Sabha seat from Surendra Nagar.
In a very closely contested Loksabha election of Rajkot constituency in 1971, Ghanshyam Oza defeated Minoo Masani of the (Swatantra party) and became a minister in the cabinet of PM Indira Gandhi.

Oza opposed the emergency imposed by Indira Gandhi, and in the Lok Sabha election of 1977, he worked for the then Janta party under Morarji Desai. He was elected from Gujarat to Rajya Sabha (Janta Party) from 10-04-1978 to 09-04-1984.

References

External links
Official biographical sketch in Parliament of India website

1911 births
2002 deaths
Chief Ministers of Gujarat
India MPs 1957–1962
India MPs 1962–1967
India MPs 1971–1977
Lok Sabha members from Gujarat
Rajya Sabha members from Gujarat
Gujarat MLAs 1972–1974
Chief ministers from Indian National Congress
Indian National Congress politicians
Janata Party politicians
Saurashtra MLAs 1952–1956